Riis Park is a 56-acre park on Chicago's Northwest Side in the Belmont-Cragin neighborhood. The park is named for Jacob Riis, a famous New York City muckraker journalist and photographer who documented the plight of the poor and working class. Riis was designed to include a variety of recreational amenities for the middle class community that it served.  It was developed in 1928 when a ski jump and golf course was installed.  Chicago Architect Walter W. Ahlschlager designed the fieldhouse.

The park was added to the National Register of Historic Places in 1995  and the National Register Information System ID is 95000483.

References

Parks in Chicago
North Side, Chicago
Historic districts in Chicago
Parks on the National Register of Historic Places in Chicago
Historic districts on the National Register of Historic Places in Illinois